An, AN, aN, or an may refer to:

Businesses and organizations 
 Airlinair (IATA airline code AN)
 Alleanza Nazionale, a former political party in Italy
 AnimeNEXT, an annual anime convention located in New Jersey
 Anime North, a Canadian anime convention
 Ansett Australia, a major Australian airline group that is now defunct (IATA designator AN)
 Apalachicola Northern Railroad (reporting mark AN) 1903–2002
 AN Railway, a successor company, 2002–
 Aryan Nations, a white supremacist religious organization
 Australian National Railways Commission, an Australian rail operator from 1975 until 1987
 Antonov, a Ukrainian (formerly Soviet) aircraft manufacturing and services company, as a model prefix

Entertainment and media 
 Antv, an Indonesian television network
 Astronomische Nachrichten, or Astronomical Notes, an international astronomy journal
 Avisa Nordland, a Norwegian newspaper
 Sweet Bean (あん), a 2015 Japanese film also known as An

Language 
 An, English indefinite article
 Anglo-Norman language
 Aragonese language (ISO 639-1:2002 language code AN)
 Algemeen Nederlands (meaning "Common Dutch"), the official Dutch language
 A variant of the prefix "in", used before vowels to convey the meaning "not" (for example: aneuploid means "not euploid")

Mathematics, science, and technology 
 An, in mathematics, a root system and its Dynkin diagram
 An, in mathematics, conventional notation for the alternating group
 an, a generic label for a term of a sequence
 AN thread, Army and Navy thread - for bolts and tube fittings in 16th inch increments
 Acanthosis nigricans, a skin condition
 Acrylonitrile, an organic compound and monomer used in the manufacture of certain plastics
 Actinide (An), informal symbol for a series of chemical elements
 Ammonium nitrate (AN), a chemical compound
 Anode, in electronic schematics
 Anorexia nervosa, an eating disorder
 Application note (in engineering), most often seen as A.N.
 Attonewton (aN), an SI unit of force
 Anorthite, a feldspar mineral

Military 
 A prefix used by the U.S. military for electronic equipment named under the Joint Electronics Type Designation System
 Net laying ship (US Navy hull classification symbol AN)
 Avtomat Nikonova used for the AN-94

Names 
 Ahn (Korean name) (安) 
 An (surname) (安), Chinese surname

Places
 An County, in Sichuan, China
 Agios Nikolaos (disambiguation), a common place name in Greece and Cyprus
 Province of Ancona, a province of Italy (ISO 3166-2:IT code AN)
 Andaman and Nicobar Islands, a territory in southeastern India (ISO 3166 code AN)
 Anderson County, Kansas (state county code AN)
 Andorra (obsolete NATO country code AN)
 Angola (World Meteorological Organization country code AN)
 Netherlands Antilles (ISO country code AN)

Religion 
 An (Shintō), a small table or platform used during Shinto ceremonies
 Anu or An, a god in Sumerian and Babylonian mythology

Other uses 
 Associate degree in nursing
 Algebraic notation (chess) (AN), the standard system for recording moves in chess

See also
 Aan (disambiguation)
 Ann (disambiguation)